Cyathoselinum is a genus of flowering plants belonging to the family Apiaceae. Its sole species is Cyathoselinum tomentosum. Its native range is Southeastern Europe.

References

Apioideae
Monotypic Apioideae genera